O'Connor is a township in the Canadian province of Ontario, located  west of the city of Thunder Bay. The municipality was formed on January 1, 1907. The township serves as a bedroom community of Thunder Bay, with some agriculture, and is part of Thunder Bay's Census Metropolitan Area.

The township was opened to settlement in 1887 because of the silver mining boom, and named by the Ontario government after Port Arthur businessman, alderman and police magistrate James Joseph O'Connor (1857–1930).

The current mayor of O'Connor is Jim Vezina. The township has four councillors, Chantal Alkins, Kevin Foekens, Jerry Loan, and Bishop Racicot.

The township maintains a disposal site, a skating rink, basketball court, and a fire station staffed by volunteer fire fighters. The township produces and distributes a newsletter called The Cornerstone.

O'Connor's primary industry is agriculture. Many residents commute to work either to Thunder Bay or the surrounding woodlands.

Geography

The geography of O'Connor is mainly flat open farmland and rolling hills, with the Whitefish River Valley dominating the southeast corner of the township. The township contains many creeks and rivers. The most notable geographic feature is Kakabeka Falls, located in the northeastern corner of the municipality near the community of Kakabeka Falls, Ontario.

Transportation

The municipality is served by highways 590 and 595, which intersect in the northern half of the municipality. Highway 590 connects the community to the Trans-Canada Highway (Highway 11/17) at Kakabeka Falls in neighbouring Oliver Paipoonge.

Demographics 

Media 

The township receives good quality radio from Thunder Bay. Some radio stations from Thunder Bay do not reach this township, such as CILU-FM, The Lakehead University campus radio, and Magic 99.9 FM. Major radio 105.3 The Giant and Rock 94 reach the township with good reception.

See also
List of townships in Ontario

References

External links

Municipalities in Thunder Bay District
Single-tier municipalities in Ontario
Township municipalities in Ontario